Le Faouët is a commune in the Côtes-d'Armor department of Brittany in northwestern France.

Population

Inhabitants of Le Faouët are called faouëtiens in French.

See also
Communes of the Côtes-d'Armor department

References

External links

https://www.lefaouet.com/ 

Communes of Côtes-d'Armor